Percy Prado Ruiz (born 14 January 1996) is a Peruvian professional footballer who plays as a right-back.

Professional career
Born in Lima, Peru, Prado emigrated to France at the age of 4, and joined the youth academy of FC Nantes at the age of 6. He made his professional debut with in an 8–0 Coupe de la Ligue win over Paris FC on 30 October 2019.

References

External links
 
 
 

1999 births
Living people
People from Lima Region
Peruvian footballers
Association football fullbacks
FC Nantes players
Ligue 1 players
Championnat National 2 players
Championnat National 3 players
Peruvian emigrants to France